C10orf53 is a protein that in humans is encoded by the C10orf53 gene. The gene is located on the positive strand of the DNA and is 30,611 nucleotides in length. The protein is 157 amino acids and the gene has 3 exons. C10orf53 orthologs are found in mammals, birds, reptiles, amphibians, fish, and invertebrates. It is primarily expressed in the testes and at very low levels in the cerebellum, liver, placenta, and trachea.

Gene 
Chromosome 10 open reading frame 53 (10orf53), also known as uncharacterized protein family 0728 (UPF0728), in humans, is encoded by Chromosome 10 (10q11.23), spanning 30,611 nucleotides. The gene is located on the positive strand with 3 identified exons.

Transcript 

The table outlines the two identified isoforms of C10orf53. The most common isoform has 93 amino acids which is a shorter amino acid sequence due to an alternative 3’ terminal exon and distinct C-terminus. Isoform A has a higher frequency of analysis due to it being the longer isoform. The analysis in this article is focused on isoform A.

Structure 
The molecular weight predicted was 17.6 kDa. The isoelectric point for C10orf53 is estimated to be 6.36 pl

Secondary 

 MPKNAVVILRYGPYSAAGLPVEHHTFRLQGLQAVLAIDGHEVILEKIEDWNVVELMVNEEVIFHCNI         67

 CCCCCSSSSSSCCCHHCCSSSSSCHHHHHHHHHHHHHCCCSSSSSSSCCCCSSSSSSCCCSSSSSCC         67

 KDLEFGKLTPSSDKRTTSSSRLTFHQLSSPCRMKVSPLQQFPQKTQDLTCTVLAQIGSCIHFQTNLC         134

 CCCCCCCCCHHHHHHHHHHHHHHHHCCCCHHHHCCCHHHHCCCCCCCSSSSSHHHHCCSSSSSCCCC         134

 DLGWPGLDHMLISGLEKRGTQPY                                                     157

 CCCCCCCHHHHHHHHHHCCCCCC                                                     157
The secondary structure above illustrates the estimated secondary structure for Isoform A of C10orf53. The C that are italicized indicate that the amino acid is located within a coil, the bolded S is referring to the amino acid being in a strand, and the underlined H shows the amino acid is in a helix. The strand and helix structures can then be translated into the predicted tertiary structure done through I-TASSER.

Tertiary 
The predicted tertiary structure of C10orf53 is shown. The tertiary structure contains the seven helix and 8 strand structures predicted through I-TASSER.

Regulation

Gene 
C10orf53 is primarily expressed in the testes, but also has very low levels of expression in the cerebellum, liver, placenta, and trachea. It is tissue-specific to the testes due to the low expression in other tissues compared to the testes. C10orf53 majorly is secreted in the cytoplasm of cells and has moderate levels in the nucleus and mitochondria.

Protein 
C10orf53 was found to have two phosphorylation sites, two SUMOylation sites, and one lysine acetylation site. All of these regions are shown in the conceptual translation of C10orf53.

Evolution 

C10orf53 is predicted to have a slower evolution compared to the gene, fibrinogen alpha, but it also has a quicker evolution compared to cytochrome c. Fibrinogen alpha is considered as a gene that had evolved rather quickly when examining the gene in different organisms. When two organisms diverged into different taxa, the gene went through alterations that made it significantly different from other organisms, causing it to have a quick rate of evolution. In contrast, Cytochrome C is relatively conserved throughout different organisms, which shows that it has a slow rate of evolution. C10orf53 has a rate of evolution that is smaller than fibrinogen alpha, but larger than cytochrome c.

Homology 
A group of distantly and closely related orthologs were chosen and categorized by their date of divergence from humans. The percent similarity and percent identity in relation to humans showed the predicted conservation between C10orf53 in humans compared to their orthologs.

Interacting Proteins 

The table contains all predicted proteins that were found to interact with C10orf53. It includes the protein acronym and name, the means that identification occurred, and the function of each protein. Due to the related function of some of the proteins, this provides evidence that these interactions coincide with the predicted location.

Clinical Significance 
A study was conducted that compared the relative spermatogenesis in humans to the relative expression of RNAs correlated to teratozoospermia. In non-afflicted humans, there is a relatively high expression of C10orf53 across the RNAs tested. However, when a human had teratozoospermia, those levels dropped to almost zero. Another study examined the expression of C10orf53 in spermatogenesis and testis development in mice during development. C10orf53 is only highly expressed from day 30-56 of mice development, with the expression decreasing slightly on each five-day period until 56 days were reached. The final study looked at research done within the past five years has correlated African American prostate cancer patients with the presence of C10orf535. When examining the exosome found in Caucasian populations associated with prostate cancer (PCC) against the African American exosome (PAA), C10orf53 was unique only to PAA.

References